Josef Berg (8 March 1927 – 26 February 1971) was a Czech composer, musicologist and librettist. His work represents a remarkable value in the context of Czech music after World War II.

Life 
From 1946 to 1950 he studied at the Brno Conservatory, in the class of Vilém Petrželka. Simultaneously he attended the music lectures at the Faculty of Philosophy on Brno university given by Jan Racek and Bohumír Štědroň. He worked as a music editor in the Czechoslovak Radio in Brno (1950–53), and also wrote reviews for the journals and newspapers. Later he concentrated exclusively on composing. Berg founded an association of young composers called Group A. The members of the group strived in their program to connect convincing artistic activity with the new musical language, and also to promote new musical trends in Czechoslovakia.

Style 
Even though the Berg's style was at first influenced by Moravian folk music, his mature compositions are very individual and take advantage of new composition techniques and principles. However, his works are not mere technical exercises. Particularly in chamber music Berg brought spontaneous creative invention. Berg was successful in the field of vocal and scenic music, and composed song cycles to his own lyrics. He also made a number of contributions to the chamber opera genre, including The Return of Ulysses, European Tourism, Breakfast at the Schlankenwald Castle and Euphrides in Front of the Gates of Tymenas.

Selected works 
Months. Piano cycle (1956)
Seven Preludies for Piano (1959)
Sextet for Harp, Piano and String Quartet (1959)
Nonet for Two Harps, Piano, Cembalo, Glockenspiel, Vibraphone, Xylophone and Percussion (1962)
Return of Ulysses (chamber opera, 1962)
Songs of new Werther for Baryton and Piano (1962)
Sonata per cavicembalo e pianoforte in modo classico (1964)
Organ Music on the Theme of Gilles Binchois (1964)
European Tourism (a chamber opera, 1963–64)
String Quartet (1965)
Breakfast at the Schlankenwald Castle (chamber opera, 1966)
Johannes Doctor Faust (opera, 1963-1969)
Dreaming - Snění (1970)

Footnotes 

https://web.archive.org/web/20110522214354/http://www.musica.cz/skladatele/berg-josef.html

References 
 Štaudová, Eliška: Slovo i fónické struktury v hudbě nestorů Nové hudby v Brně. in: Hudební rozhledy 1970, no. 10-11, p. 491-497.
 Hrabal, František: Marginálie k Josefu Bergovi. in: Hudební rozhledy 1971, no. 4, p. 169-176.
 Doubravová, Jarmila: Světlá stránka pochybností Josefa Berga. in: Hudební rozhledy 1976, p. 461-3.
 Lébl, Vladimír: Josef Berg in: Příspěvky k dějinám české hudby III." Academia, Prague 1976.
 Martínková, Alena (ed.): Čeští skladatelé současnosti Prague: Panton, 1985.
 Štaudová, Eliška: Josef Berg. Personálni bibliografie. Státní vědecká knihovna, Brno 1987. - personal bibliography
 Opus musicum, 1987, no. 2. - issue of music periodical completely dedicated to Josef Berg
 Hrabal, František (ed.): Josef Berg. Texty. Panton, Prague 1988. - anthology of Josef Berg's texts and poems
 Lébl, Vladimír: Zpráva o večeru Josefa Berga. in: Konserva/Na hudbu 1992, no. 4.
 Štědroň, Miloš: Josef Berg - skladatel mezi hudbou, literaturou a divadlem. Masaryk university, Brno 1992. - monograph
 Kofroň, Petr: Josef Berg předvádí happening. in: Třináct analýz, H&H 1993, p. 53-60.
 Šťastný, Jaroslav: Josef Berg a jeho Snění. JAMU, Brno 2002 - monograph.

External links 
 English link

1927 births
1971 deaths
20th-century classical composers
Czech classical composers
Czech male classical composers
Czech opera composers
Male opera composers
Musicians from Brno
20th-century Czech male musicians
Brno Conservatory alumni